Punk rock and hardcore punk have created a punk subculture in Sweden since punk music became popular in the 1970s.

History
Swedish punk, the most famous Swedish punk band was Ebba Grön, followed by KSMB; other notable bands were Asta Kask, Kriminella Gitarrer, Tant Strul, Pink champagne , The Pain and Göteborg Sound. In the 1980s hardcore punk, kängpunk and raw punk became popular in Sweden. The two most influential bands are Mob 47 and Anti Cimex, whose music has also inspired many foreign bands. Some other examples of influential bands are Moderat Likvidation, Black Uniforms, Totalitär and Avskum. Together with the early American hardcore bands and the British band Discharge, the Swedish punk scene since the early 1990s consisted almost exclusively of "tribute bands" to the above. In the 1990s the aggressive punk scene turned more towards crust punk with bands like Driller Killer, Skitsystem, Wolfbrigade, and Disfear.

The genre is in Sweden also connected with the hardcore scene that emerged in Umeå and other northern cities in the 1990s, with bands such as Refused (Umeå) and Raised Fist (Luleå) in the lead. Refused had a strong base in the genre's traditional roots and may in part represent how it sounded then, but experimented and stretched the limits sufficiently to their most famous songs rather have come under the term post-hardcore.

The majority of the genre called melodic hardcore influenced later skate punk/pop punk into what it became in the 1990s.

There is also a Swedish subgenre called trallpunk, with its roots in '80s melodic punkbands and raw punk bands like Asta Kask, Total Egon, Strebers, Charta 77, Puke, Rolands Gosskör and Sötlimpa, etc. Many of these early trallpunk bands had a powerful folk music undertone and a style of music with catchy melodies, fast drum speed and narrative texts, often left-wing political lyrics, and unlike the more aggressive hardcore punk, straight to the point lyrics. Notable trallpunk bands include De lyckliga kompisarna, Strebers, Dia Psalma, Charta 77, Coca Carola, Räserbajs, köttgrottorna,  Radioaktiva Räker. later trallpunk bands took inspiration from American skatepunk and play a mix between the two. For example, Skumdum.

In the 2000s many old Swedish punk bands such as Asta Kask, Dia Psalma, Mob 47, Moderat Likvidation and De lyckliga kompisarna reunited with most of them releasing new albums with new songs. This decade many hardcore punk bands from Umeå and northern Sweden started to play more pop-influenced punk and the early Swedish punk like Ebba Grön and KSMB, for example Invasionen with Dennis Lyxzén from Refused and Knugen Faller with Inge Johansson from Totalt jävla mörker.

Notable bands

1970s and 1980s
 Ebba Grön
 Anti Cimex
 Disarm (band)
 Mob 47
 KSMB
 Incest Brothers
 Attentat
 Rude Kids
 Kriminella Gitarrer
 Warheads
 Asta Kask
 Sighstens Grannar
 Tant Strul
 Totalitär
 Avskum
 Strebers
 De lyckliga kompisarna
 Charta 77

1990s
 Abhinanda
 Driller Killer
 Skitsystem
 Wolfbrigade
 Disfear
 Refused
 Raised Fist
 Abhinanda
 Radioaktiva räker
 Satanic Surfers
 Dia Psalma
 Millencolin
 Skumdum
 Outlast
 No Fun At All
 Randy

2000s
 Invasionen
 Knugen Faller
 Masshysteri
 Suis La Lune
 Makthaverskan
 Disconvenience
 Snorting Maradonas
 Fornicators
 Honnör SS
 Shuvit

Notable labels
Birdnest Records - started by Charta 77's Per Granberg

References
 Svensk punk 1977-81 - Varför tror du vi låter som vi låter?

Sweden
Swedish music